Rabensberg (also spelled Rabensberk and Rabensperg) is a German place name that may refer to:

 Koprivnik Castle, a castle ruin in the Municipality of Moravče, central Slovenia
 Ranšperk Castle, a castle ruin in Rupe, Municipality of Celje, eastern Slovenia
 Vranja Peč, a settlement in the Municipality of Kamnik, northern Slovenia